Danbury is a town in Merrimack County, New Hampshire, United States. The population was 1,250 at the 2020 census.

History

Danbury was first settled  as a part of Alexandria, but mountainous terrain separated it from the rest of the town. In 1795, it was set off and incorporated, the name suggested by a settler from Danbury, Connecticut. The town later grew by adding land from Wilmot and Hill. Farmers found the surface mostly hilly, but with some good intervales suitable for agriculture. Raising cattle and sheep became the principal occupation. By 1859, when the population was 934, it had seven sawmills, two shingle, lath and clapboard mills, and one tannery.

Geography
The Smith River, an east-flowing tributary of the Pemigewasset River, runs through the center of town, while the southwest part of town is drained by Walker Brook and Frazier Brook, south-flowing tributaries of the Blackwater River, which continues on to the Contoocook River. The northeast corner of the town drains east to Newfound Lake, which flows into the Pemigewasset River. The entire town is part of the Merrimack River watershed. Waukeena Lake, School Pond, and Bog Pond are a few of the bodies of water within the town limits.

The Sunapee-Ragged-Kearsarge Greenway hiking trail crosses a corner of Danbury along Ragged Mountain's Ridge Trail. Access to the Ridge Trail from the SRK Greenway is on the SRKG 6.1 mile trail section 9, either from trailhead parking on New Canada Road in Wilmot from the northwest or from Proctor Academy's trailhead parking in Andover from the southeast.

Danbury is the northernmost town in Merrimack County and lies within the Dartmouth-Lake Sunapee Region. The town is served by U.S. Route 4 and New Hampshire Route 104.

Adjacent municipalities 
 Alexandria (north)
 Hill (east)
 Andover (south)
 Wilmot (southwest)
 Grafton (west)

Demographics

In 1800, there were 165 people living in Danbury, according to the first official census.

As of the 2000 census, there were 1,071 people, 435 households, and 310 families residing in the town.  The population density was 28.6 people per square mile (11.0/km).  There were 596 housing units at an average density of 15.9 per square mile (6.1/km).  The racial makeup of the town was:

 99.53% White (U.S. average: 75.1%)
 0.19% African American (U.S. average: 12.3%)
 0.09% Native American (U.S. average: 0.1%)
 0.19% from two or more races. (U.S. average: 2.4%)

Hispanic or Latino of any race were 0.47% of the population. (U.S. average: 12.5%)

In 2000, there were 435 households with an average household size of 2.46 and an average family size of 2.84.
 31.0% had children under the age of 18 living with them. (U.S. average: 32.8%)
 57.7% were married couples living together. (U.S. average: 51.7%)
 8.7% had a female householder with no husband present. (U.S. average: 12.2%)
 28.7% were non-families. (U.S. average: 31.9%)
 20.9% of all households were made up of individuals. (U.S. average: 25.8%)
 6.9% had someone living alone who was 65 years of age or older.  (U.S. average: 9.2%)

In 2000, the town's population had a median age of 41 years (U.S. average: 35.3).
 23.0% under the age of 18
 6.8% from 18 to 24
 30.7% from 25 to 44
 26.7% from 45 to 64
 12.8% who were 65 years of age or older.

For every 100 females, there were 104.0 males.  For every 100 females age 18 and over, there were 104.7 males.

The median income for a household in the town was $38,313 (U.S. average: $41,994).  The median income for a family was $40,809 (U.S. average: $50,046).  Males had a median income of $32,105 versus $26,328 for females. The per capita income for the town was $18,339.   About 8.9% of families (U.S. average: 9.2%), and 11.1% of the population (U.S. average: 12.4%) were below the poverty line, including 11.9% of those under age 18 and 9.3% of those age 65 or over.

Education
Danbury is within the Newfound Area School District. Danbury Elementary School is in the community. The district's secondary schools are Newfound Memorial Middle School, and Newfound Regional High School in Bristol.

Places of interest
 Ragged Mountain Resort, ski and golf vacation resort
 Danbury North Road Schoolhouse Museum, run by Danbury Historical Society. More info.
 Bog Pond Dam or Danbury Bog,  recreational reservoir
 Waukeena Lake,  cold water lake, motorboats restricted
 School Pond,  warm water pond, motorboats restricted
 Emily & Theodore Hope Forest  property preserved by the Society for the Protection of New Hampshire Forests (SPNHF)
 Rosemary's Woods,  SPNHF property
 Independence Park, municipal multi-purpose field

Notable people 

 Francis Reed (1852–1917), inventor of many lathe and drill machines
 Amos Leavitt Taylor, Secretary of Massachusetts Republican Party (1927–1928); Massachusetts Republican State Chair (1924–1949)

See also

 Northern Rail Trail (New Hampshire)
 Ragged Mountain Resort

References

External links
 
 George Gamble Library
 New Hampshire Economic and Labor Market Information Bureau Profile

 
Towns in Merrimack County, New Hampshire
Towns in New Hampshire